Dóra Maurer (born 1937 in Budapest) is a Hungarian visual artist whose work has spanned a 50-year career. She works in almost every medium, from film and photography, to painting, performance, and sculpture.  Principally achieving recognition in the 1970s with avant-garde work, Maurer has developed her art career from works with contemporary and modern influences that have been shown worldwide. Her art is based on mathematical  and complex system processes. Most of Maurer's work follows the theme of showing options to the viewer and what the viewer can do with those options. Many of her works break down simple actions so the viewer can really view the piece as movement, not a photograph of movement. Dóra Maurer has in addition been a professor at the Faculty of Fine Arts in Budapest and a curator.

Life 
Maurer trained as a graphic artist in the 1950s. In the 1970s she started to work in photography and moving images, often collaborating with musicians. She also taught creative performative workshops. She created increasingly geometric and abstract drawings and paintings in the 1970s onwards.

In 2019 to 2020, she was the subject of a major retrospective exhibition at the Tate Modern. White Cube Gallery began to represent Maurer in 2019. She is also represented by Carl Kostyál.

Works
In Dóra Maurer's work, geometric, mathematical, and conceptual systems all appear. These are the processes in which her mind thinks when creating her art. Dóra Maurer explores different cycles in showing things such as simple actions to make the viewer see her art as movement. She simply gives the viewer examples of things she can do with different objects, to make them think about what they would do. All of Maurer's work displays geometric compositions and designs. She is very methodical with the composition she uses, the images, lines, width of lines, colors, angles, and more. Some of her best known works come from her quasi-photos, her series Reversible and Changeable Phases of Movement, and her most recent series, Overlappings.

While Dóra Maurer states that her works are simple examples of what she can do, many critics like to attach political undertones to them. In the past, people have said that her works are examples of the socialist background in which she grew up. It is important to note, however, that Dóra Maurer does not consider her art political, nor does she bear the thought in mind when creating. In fact, Maurer has said that the only reason people say her work is political, is because everything made during that time was political. Most of this critique is attributed to her work done in the 1960s to 1980s.

Maurer began to develop surreal etchings in 1961, exploring the technical possibilities of the medium. In 1969/1970 she began to create time-based works that time and space and energy have on an event. In the experimental film Timing (1973–1980) she folds a white cloth against a black background, making it as small as possible, in a total of seven steps. As the image itself is halved, then divided in four and finally in eight, and the steps in the folding process are played at the same time, the white surfaces of the cloth merge in some places, resulting in one image.

Exhibitions

Solo exhibitions 
Dóra Maurer, Carl Kostyál, London, 2015
 – Snapshots, 18 October 2014–19 April 2015
 6 out of 5, Curated by Katharine Kostyál, White Cube Masons Yard, 24 May 2016–9 July 2016
 Dóra Maurer, Curated by Katharine Kostyál, White Cube Bermondsey, 12 September 2019–3 November 2019
 Tate Modern – 5 August 2019 – 5 July 2020

Group exhibitions 

 For Pete’s Sake. Carl Kostyál, Stockholm, 2016

References

Living people
1937 births
Artists from Budapest
20th-century Hungarian women artists
21st-century Hungarian women artists